Devonian is a geologic period and system of the Paleozoic Era. 

Devonian may also refer to:

Places
 Devonian Gardens (Calgary), an indoor near Calgary, Canada
 Devonian Way, a highway west of Edmonton, Canada
 University of Alberta Botanic Garden, formerly Devonian Botanic Garden, near Devon, Alberta, Canada

Other uses
SS Devonian, a steamship built in 1902 as Hanoverian
A person or something from the county of Devon in the United Kingdom
Devonian (passenger train), a named British express train

See also 
 Devon (disambiguation)